Dialium travancoricum is a critically endangered species of plant in the family Fabaceae. It is found only in Kerala India specifically around the Travancore range near Ponmudi and Ariankavu. It is threatened by habitat loss.

References

travancoricum
Flora of Kerala
Critically endangered plants
Taxonomy articles created by Polbot